Jai Prakash Anchal is an Indian politician and a member of the Samajwadi Party from the state of Uttar Pradesh. Anchal is a member of the Eighteenth Assembly of Uttar Pradesh representing the Bairia Vidhan Sabha constituency.

He lost his seat in the 2017 Uttar Pradesh Assembly election to Surendra Nath Singh of the Bharatiya Janata Party.

References

External links 
Uttar Pradesh Legislative Assembly

Living people
Samajwadi Party politicians
Year of birth missing (living people)
Uttar Pradesh MLAs 2022–2027